The hypothalamospinal tract arises mainly from the paraventricular nucleus, lateral and posterior hypothalamic areas. This tract descends through the periaqueductal gray and adjacent reticular formation. The hypothalamospinal tract also connects the hypothalamus to the ciliospinal center of the intermediolateral cell column in the spinal cord (T1 to L2). It is found in the dorsolateral quadrant of the lateral funiculus, in the lateral tegmentum of the medulla, pons and midbrain. Lesions of the hypothalamospinal tract cause ipsilateral Horner's syndrome.

Lesions of the posterior inferior cerebellar artery (PICA) or the vertebral artery can lead to lateral medullary syndrome, with ipsilateral Horner's Syndrome as the result of lesioning this nucleus.

References 

Hypothalamus
Brainstem
Central nervous system pathways